Proposition 2 was a referendum for a state constitutional amendment placed on the ballot by the Texas legislature and approved by the voters at the November 8, 2005 general election. The measure added a new provision to the Texas Constitution, Article 1, Section 32, which provides that "Marriage in this state shall consist only of the union of one man and one woman", and "This state or a political subdivision of this state may not create or recognize any legal status identical or similar to marriage." Texas thus became the nineteenth US state to adopt constitutional amendment banning same-sex marriage. It was the most populous state to adopt a constitutional ban on same-sex marriage until California passed its ban in November 2008.

Full text
Article 1, Section 32 of the Texas Constitution, as amended, states:

The joint resolution proposing the amendment included additional language about rights that the ban on same-sex marriage was not meant to restrict:

Legislative approval

As provided in Article 17, Section 1 of the Texas Constitution, a proposed constitutional amendment is placed on the ballot only after the Texas legislature has proposed the amendment in a joint resolution of both the Texas senate and the Texas house of representatives. The joint resolution may originate in either chamber. The resolution must be adopted by a vote of at least two-thirds of the membership of each chamber. That means a minimum of 100 votes in the house and 21 votes in the senate.

On April 25, 2005, the house voted 101 in favor and 29 against the proposed amendment to ban same-sex marriage and civil unions, authored by Warren Chisum. On May 21, 2005, the senate voted 21 in favor and 8 against the proposed amendment, and the ballot was set for November 8.

Campaign

Campaign funding and spending
Proponents raised $122,000, almost all from two donors, and opponents $391,000 in support of their campaigns on the proposition.

Proposition 2 attracted nearly $1.3 million in contributions.  Seven committees opposing the proposition raised $782,410, almost 55 percent more than the nearly $506,000 collected by nine committees supporting it. Four committees against the measure raised $774,440, or almost 99 percent of the money raised to fight Proposition 2.

Contributors across state lines 

The National Gay & Lesbian Task Force gave nearly $122,000. All but $10,000 went to one committee in Texas.
Focus on the Family, a Colorado-based Christian organization led by Dr. James Dobson, gave almost $51,200 to a Texas committee it formed. Although the group's Kansas committee did not report any contributions, it did disclose expenditures of nearly $24,500, mostly on radio advertisements.
The Human Rights Campaign, a national organization promoting equality for homosexuals, contributed $34,900 to oppose the Texas measure.

Supporters

Supporters for the Proposition 2 (2005) were approximately 76% of the Texas voting population. Supporters claimed that marriage is a union between a man and a woman and these unions creates a child. The poll show at the time of the voting was approximately 82% in a public poll. The Texas Governor Rick Perry said at the time of the voting said, "Like the vast majority of Texans, I believe that marriage represents a sacred union between a man and a woman." Although his signature was irrelevant legally, Governor Rick Perry held a signing ceremony at an evangelical church in Fort Worth.

Opponents

Shortly before the election, a Presbyterian minister in Austin, Tom Hegar, argued that "a liberal activist judge" might interpret the wording of Subsection (b) to outlaw marriage itself and said, "Don't risk it; vote against it."

Attorney General Greg Abbott, however, defended the language of the amendment. Proponents claimed that criticism of the amendment's language was a "smokescreen" to confuse voters on the issue.

Pre-decision opinion polls

Many predicted Proposition 2 would pass, including opponents of Proposition 2. Supporters of Proposition 2, however, believed Texans might not vote because they will be overconfident after seeing landslide victories for marriage bans in other states.

 A 2003 poll showed that 63 percent of Texans surveyed said they support a state prohibition on same-sex marriages.
 An August 2005 Houston poll found that 64 percent of African Americans in Texas supported protection in the workplace for LGBT people. However, that same poll found 62 percent opposed same-sex couples being allowed to marry.

Results

Proposition 2 passed by a vote of more than three to one. With around 17.97 percent voter turnout, this was the highest participation in a constitutional amendment election since 1991, boasted by the same-sex marriage ban. Matt Foreman, executive director of the National Gay and Lesbian Task Force, said the outcome was not unexpected: "When you put a fundamental right of a minority up for popular vote, it's almost impossible to win."

County breakdown

Of Texas's 254 counties, 253 of the 254 voted in favor of Proposition 2. Travis County, which includes Austin, was the only county to oppose the amendment, with slightly under 60% of voters opposing it. Houston and Dallas, the 6th and 8th cities with the largest LGBT populations in the US, voted for Proposition 2.  The largest county in Texas, Harris, voted 72.5 percent to 27.5 percent for Proposition 2, with 17.5 percent voter turn out; however, two Montrose-area precincts of the county with substantial homosexual populations reported turnouts of around 35 percent. King County, the most Republican county in Texas, had the highest voter turnout of any county, with 54.16 percent, while Starr County, the most Democratic county in Texas, had the lowest voter turnout of any county, with 3.05 percent.

Of the counties containing the ten largest Texas cities, Houston, San Antonio, Dallas, Austin, Fort Worth, El Paso, Arlington, Corpus Christi, Plano, and Laredo, only Austin voted against Proposition 2. Of the counties containing the ten largest Texas universities, Texas A&M University, the University of Texas at Austin, the University of Houston, the University of North Texas, Texas State University–San Marcos, the University of Texas at Arlington, Texas Tech University, the University of Texas at San Antonio, the University of Texas at El Paso, and the University of Texas at Dallas, only the University of Texas at Austin voted against Proposition 2. Glen Maxey, the first openly gay member of the Texas House of Representatives, visited the University of Texas campus after the polls closed, where he said students voted more than 4-to-1 against the amendment. Students at the University of Houston, University of North Texas, and Texas State University voted 2-to-1 against the amendment. However students at Texas A&M University and Baylor University voted 6-to-1 in favor of the amendment.

Effects
In November 2009, Barbara Ann Radnofsky, a candidate for Texas Attorney General, claimed that the amendment, because it was poorly drafted, outlawed all marriage in Texas.

The Williams Institute projected that legalizing same-sex marriage in Texas would add $182.5 million to the state's economy in the first three years.

Legal challenge

On October 1, 2009, a state district court judge in the case of In Re Marriage of J.B. and H.B. ruled the amendment unconstitutional under the Equal Protection Clause of the Fourteenth Amendment of the United States Constitution. The lawsuit was filed by two men living in Dallas who had married in Massachusetts in 2006. They were seeking a divorce in Texas because Massachusetts permits only state residents to sue for divorce. Texas Attorney General Greg Abbott and Governor Rick Perry appealed to the Fifth Court of Appeals in Dallas. On August 31, 2010, the appellate court reversed the district court, ruling that the amendment does not violate the U.S. Constitution and that district courts in Texas do not have subject-matter jurisdiction to hear a same-sex divorce case.

See also
LGBT rights in Texas
LGBT history in Texas
U.S. state constitutional amendments banning same-sex unions

References

Further reading

External links
 State Ballot Measures, 2005 – National Institute on Money in State Politics

2005 in LGBT history
LGBT in Texas
2005 in American law
U.S. state constitutional amendments banning same-sex unions
proposition 2
2005 ballot measures
Texas ballot measures
Same-sex marriage ballot measures in the United States